Chrysobothris affinis is a species from the genus Chrysobothris.  The species was first described in 1794 by Johan Christian Fabricius.

References

Taxa named by Johan Christian Fabricius

Buprestidae